Learning development describes work with students and staff to develop academic practices, with a main focus on students developing academic practices in higher education, which assess the progress of knowledge acquired by the means of structural approaches (Tejero, 2020). Learning developers are academic professionals who: teach, advise and facilitate students to develop their academic practices; create academic development learning resources; and reflect on their own academic practices through a community of practice.

Hilsdon (2011: 14) defines learning development as,
"a complex set of multi-disciplinary and cross-disciplinary academic roles and functions, involving teaching, tutoring, research, and the design and production of learning materials, as well as involvement in staff development, policy-making and other consultative activities."

Learning development is a term used mainly within UK and Australian academia, with some overlap with academic advising in the USA. The learning development movement in the UK has aligned itself closely with the UK Educational Development movement in light of its developmental work with academic staff. However, the primary objective of learning development remains the development of student learning.

History

The learning development movement began with the recognition of a new direction of practice emerging by founding and early members of an email discussion forum Community in 2002, which was transferred to the documented JISCMail Listserv Community LDHEN in 2003. Early members were all involved in the provision of study skills support, but recognised the limitations of a purely study-skills approach.

From 2005 onward, the establishment of the LearnHigher CETL (Centre of Excellence in Teaching and Learning) contributed greatly to the volume of publicly available learning development resources. The LearnHigher CELT was funded by the Higher Education Funding Council and comprised a consortium of teams from 16 universities, led by Liverpool Hope University to develop learning resources in 20 areas of study. LearnHigher aimed to develop and maintain a bank of open access materials for self-access by students. The CETL later referred to their work as learning development.

The LDHEN later restructured and formed the Association of Learning Development in Higher Education (ALDinHE), who published the first peer reviewed journal dedicated to learning development, The Journal of Learning Development in Higher Education. This organisation have also organised a themed national conference since 2003 and annually since 2005, contributing greatly to the development of learning development as distinct area of practice. The Staff and Educational Development Association (SEDA)have also provided space for ideas in learning development to develop, as have other student-focused organisations and conferences.

Conferences on learning development

Some observers may identify strong learning development themes in conferences in allied areas, such as Writing Development (e.g. Writing Development in Higher Education (WDHE) conferences and EATAW), Mathematics Support (e.g. the Sigma Network and the CETL-MSOR conferences) or even Educational Development (e.g. SEDA). Likewise, the HEA's What Works? conferences and the Improving Student Learning annual symposiums have strongly tangential themes. However, these organisations/conferences rarely use the term learning development to describe their activities.

Allied areas of practice

Writing development
Writing development is administratively subsumed within learning development at a number of UK universities, where practices may be merged locally. However, writing development has rich tradition of research and practice, established before learning development and representing a distinct field.

Information literacy
Information literacy is sometimes seen as learning development, but also has its own distinct body of practice and literature.

According to the SCONUL Working Group on Information Literacy (2011: 3), Information Literacy is, "an umbrella term which encompasses concepts such as digital, visual and media literacies, academic literacy, information handling, information skills, data curation and data management."

SCONUL's seven pillars of information literacy are:
 Identify: Able to identify a personal need for information
 Scope: Can assess current knowledge and identify gaps
 Plan: Can construct strategies for locating information and data
 Gather: Can locate and access the information and data they need
 Evaluate: Can review the research process and compare and evaluate information and data
 Manage: Can organise information professionally and ethically
 Present: Can apply the knowledge gained: presenting the results of their research, synthesising new and old information and data to create new knowledge and disseminating it in a variety of ways

Mathematics support
Learning development in numeracy, mathematics and statistics, commonly referred to as "mathematics support", works with students and staff to develop mathematical practice in the disciplines. Mathematics Support ranges from basic adult numeracy to advanced support for second and third year undergraduate mathematics students. This provision is commonly provided via a mathematics (learning) support centre.

The UK mathematics support movement is seen to have begun in 1993 with a conference held at the University of Luton and was influenced by the Minnesota model of developmental mathematics, and may be considered as a sub-movement, separate and tangential to learning development.  A recent survey of mathematics support in the UK identified 88 out of 103 responding higher education institutions offering some form of mathematics support.

Mathematics support centres and services are also present in Australia and the Republic of Ireland. Statistics support for final year undergraduate and postgraduate students is often provided via a statistics advisory service.

Areas of learning development

Many learning developers resist categorising their practice into distinct subjects. For example, the use of statistics, encouraged by learning development, is cross-disciplinary, however, resources such as study guides are often categorised into distinct subjects. The following areas of learning development are taken from the LearnHigher website
 Academic writing refers to the practice of writing in the style used in academic documents, such as academic books, journal articles and conference papers. It tends to be formal and objective in tone but it should also be clear and concise.
 Assessment
 Business and commercial awareness
 Critical thinking and reflection. According to Ennis (n.d.), critical thinking involves: being as clear as possible; focusing on a single question or issue; trying to take into account the whole problem; considering all relevant alternatives; trying to be well-informed; seeking as much precision as possible; being aware of your biases and assumptions; being open-minded and taking a position if you have enough basis, or otherwise withholding judgment.

When critical thinking is applied to external sources it is called critical analysis. Critical analysis is sometimes seen as the 'holy grail' of academic writing or a 'rite of passage' for students to become accepted members of their academic community of practice. There are several different approaches to critical analysis: critically analysing a single source using a premise, argument, conclusion, application approach; moving from descriptive writing to analytical writing to evaluative writing; comparing and contrasting two different opinions using a discursive argumentation format; moving from summarising, to making simple inferences, to critiquing according to objective criteria and bringing in a personal interpretation; and using a questioning approach (who, what, where, why, etc.) to brainstorm an issue.
 Doing research involves identifying a research aim or question, planning, deciding on a theoretical framework, deciding on a method, obtaining information (primary or secondary data or a combination of the two), describing and analysing the data obtained and drawing conclusions.
 Group work
 Information literacy
 Listening and interpersonal skills
 Note making
 Numeracy, mathematics and statistics
 Oral communication
 Reading
 Referencing is the process of properly attributing secondary material to the correct authors. It commonly involves citing sources and creating a reference list at the end of a document. Failure to reference correctly can lead to plagiarism.
 Report writing is similar to academic writing but it relates to more structured documents, such as technical reports and dissertations. These documents normally contain chapters which may be divided into sections or subsections, etc. There is often a specific genre for writing individual chapters within a report.
 Time management
 Visual practices

A developmental model

The learning development movement emphasises learner development from any prior level of ability. This view is generally opposed to study skills that represent remedial education - aiming to bring weaker students up to a set standard. However, accepting that support may be the most developmental approach in some circumstances, study skills remain a feature of learning development.

Provision for strongly performing students and the extent to which a broader base of students should engage with learning development are both currently debated issues..

The characteristics of embedded provision, one-to-one provision and resource provision are each underpinned by the developmental model adopted by learning development.

Embedding
Teaching with learning objectives is also an effective way of integrating 'learning development' into the curriculum. This characteristic is usually referred to as embedding.

One-to-one provision
Learning development practices have remained committed to provision one-to-one with academic staff.

Provision of resources

Influences
Research-informed practice in learning development has drawn on various traditions of research. Some key examples are provided below.

Academic literacies

Transitions into higher education

The student experience

Student attainment

Assessment criteria

Lea and Street have demonstrated that university staff in various disciplines have varying expectations of students in assignments. Rust et al advocate explicating assessment criteria to augment success not only in the short term, but also to better facilitate learning for the long term. Nicol and Macfarlane-Dick summarise converging literature suggesting that internal feedback and student self-regulation are only possible with a good conception of the criteria. This has prompted learning developers to work centrally to explicate or negotiate assessment criteria. This ranges from resources providing disciplinary definitions of keywords, to one-to-one practice to negotiate student understandings of assessment criteria with reference to assignment drafts.

Linguistics and EAP

English for Academic Purposes is an area which has a close relationship with Learning Development

See also
 Academic advising
 Study skills

External links
 Association for Learning Development in Higher Education (ALDinHE)
 LearnHigher
 Staff and Education Development Association (SEDA)

References

Higher education
Learning methods